is a Japanese anime and entertainment magazine which Tokuma Shoten began publishing in July 1978. Hayao Miyazaki's internationally renowned manga, Nausicaä of the Valley of the Wind, was serialized in Animage from 1982 through 1994. Other titles serialized in Animage include Ocean Waves (1990–1992), a novel by Saeko Himuro, which was later made into a television movie by the same title.

History
Animage was established in 1978 as the first magazine devoted to animation and comics aimed at a general public and not professionals. In 2007 the magazine started its online edition.

Timeline
July 1978: First issue
January 1980: First Annual Anime Grand Prix
July 1982: 50th issue
June 1983: 5th anniversary
September 1986: 100th issue
June 1988: 10th anniversary
November 1990: 150th issue
June 1993: 15th anniversary
January 1995: 200th issue
June 1998: 20th anniversary, changed to A4 size for magazine, changed title to English Animage instead of 
March 1999: 250th issue
June 2002: Beginning with July issue, changed title back to katakana 
May 2003: 300th issue
June 2003: 25th anniversary
June 2008: 30th anniversary
June 2013: 35th anniversary

Anime Grand Prix

The Anime Grand Prix is the annual prize decided by the readers' votes to the anime of the year. The Anime Grand Prix started in 1979, and the first prize was announced at the issue 1980 January, generally announced at the next year's June issue every year. It's the Animage's Anime Grand Prix Magazine Reader's Choice too.

Voice Animage

 is a sister magazine launched in 1994 that covers the voice acting industry in Japan. It was published irregularly at first, then settled into a regular release every other month. The magazine was edited by  together with Takashi Watanabe before Kobayashi moved to work on various Kadokawa Shoten magazines, and the magazine suspended publication in February 2002 with its 42nd issue. At Kadokawa, Kobayashi and Watanabe helped launch Voice Newtype.

Beginning in February 2009, Voice Animage resumed publication as a quarterly magazine. The magazine has focused mainly on male voice actors since relaunching.

AniRadi also began publishing  as a play on the name of Voice Animage.

Citations

General sources

External links
  Animage
  Tokuma Shoten

1978 establishments in Japan
Animation awards
Anime awards
Anime magazines published in Japan
Magazines established in 1978
Magazines published in Tokyo
Monthly manga magazines published in Japan
Tokuma Shoten magazines